Piotr Brzoza (born 19 October 1966) is a Polish footballer. He played in one match for the Poland national football team in 1988.

References

External links
 
 

1966 births
Living people
Polish footballers
Poland international footballers
People from Tarnowskie Góry
Association football defenders
Polonia Bytom players
Górnik Zabrze players
Śląsk Wrocław players
Odra Wodzisław Śląski players